This is a list of the municipalities in the state of Ceará (CE), located in the Northeast Region of Brazil. Ceará is divided into 184 municipalities, which are grouped into 33 microregions, which are grouped into 7 mesoregions.

See also

Geography of Brazil
List of cities in Brazil

Ceara

es:Lista de ciudades de Brasil
eo:Listo de urboj de Brazilo
fr:Villes du Brésil